waifu2x is an image scaling and noise reduction program for anime-style art and other types of photos.

waifu2x was inspired by Super-Resolution Convolutional Neural Network (SRCNN). It uses Nvidia CUDA for computing, although alternative implementations that allow for OpenCL and Vulkan have been created.

Etymology
Waifu (from the Japanese pronunciation of "wife") is anime slang for a female character to whom one is attracted.
2x means two-times magnification.

Example

See also 
Comparison gallery of image scaling algorithms

References

External links 
 
 

Image processing
Free software